Point Pass is a small town in the Mid North of South Australia, 120 kilometres North of Adelaide which is the capital city of South Australia.

The area was originally the territory of the Ngadjuri people.

Poet and tutor, Paul Gotthelf Pfeiffer, (also known as P. G. Pfeiffer), was born at Point Pass on 5 December 1916. He was schooled at Australia Plains before later boarding at Immanuel College, Adelaide, while attending the University of Adelaide. He received a Bachelor of Arts in 1938, Honours in 1939, and Masters in 1940. His poem titled Spain won the Bundey Prize for English Verse at the University of Adelaide in 1940. Along with Max Harris, Paul was also the founder of the Angry Penguins journal. He enlisted in the RAAF in July 1940, but did not survive the war, dying on 3 January 1945, in Invergordon, Scotland.

On 25 September 1895, Frieda Keysser and Carl Strehlow married at Immanuel Lutheran Church, Point Pass, after a courtship conducted only via letters. It was a double wedding with Marie Zahn and her husband Otto Siebert. Following the wedding, Frieda and Carl proceeded to Hermannsburg Mission after the wedding. Frieda and Carl were blessed with six children: Friedrich (born 1897), Martha (1899), Rudolf (1900), Karl (1902), Hermann (1905) and Theodor aka Ted Strehlow (1908).

Point Pass is no longer the thriving town that it used to be, it still has an active hotel and Lutheran church. The Lutheran church is now part of the "Eudunda Robertstown Lutheran Parish", which includes Lutheran churches at Robertstown, Point Pass, Geranium Plains, Eudunda, Neales Flat and Peep Hill.

Point Pass is on the Worlds End Highway, and was previously a stop on the Robertstown-Eudunda railway line which opened in 1914.

References 

Towns in South Australia
Mid North (South Australia)